Trujillanos is a Spanish municipality in the province of Badajoz, Extremadura, 9 km from Mérida. It has a population of 1,376 (2020) and an area of 20.3 km².

References

External links
Official website 
Profile 

 auto

Municipalities in the Province of Badajoz